Vladislav Ivanov (born 14 March 1987) is a Bulgarian male volleyball player. He was part of the Bulgaria men's national volleyball team at the 2010 FIVB Volleyball Men's World Championship in Italy. He plays for Levski Volley.

Sporting achievements

Individual
 2016 Memorial of Hubert Jerzy Wagner - Best Libero

References

1987 births
Living people
Bulgarian men's volleyball players
Sportspeople from Sofia
Bulgarian expatriate sportspeople in France
Bulgarian expatriate sportspeople in Romania
Expatriate volleyball players in France
Expatriate volleyball players in Romania
21st-century Bulgarian people